Lance Louw (born ) is a South African rugby union player. His regular position is wing.

Eastern Province Kings

In November 2013, the  invited 18 amateur club players to join their training camps prior to the 2014 Vodacom Cup season. Louw, who played his rugby for Rosebuds Rugby Club in Alicedale, was one of those selected in the training camp.

However, he wasn't named in the EP Kings squad for the 2014 Currie Cup Premier Division.

References

South African rugby union players
Living people
1990 births
Rugby union wings
Eastern Province Elephants players